PCAC may refer to:

Pacific Coast Athletic Conference
Partially conserved axial current
Payment & Clearing Association of China